The 1977 Gent–Wevelgem was the 39th edition of the Gent–Wevelgem cycle race and was held on 19 April 1977. The race started in Ghent and finished in Wevelgem. The race was won by Bernard Hinault of the Gitane–Campagnolo team.

General classification

References

Gent–Wevelgem
1977 in road cycling
1977 in Belgian sport